The men's high jump event at the 2020 Summer Olympics took place between 30 July and 1 August 2021 at the Olympic Stadium. 33 athletes from 24 nations competed; the total possible number depended on how many nations would use universality places to enter athletes in addition to the 32 qualifying through mark or ranking (no universality places were used in 2021). Italian athlete Gianmarco Tamberi along with Qatari athlete Mutaz Essa Barshim emerged as joint winners of the event following a tie between both of them as they cleared 2.37m. Both Tamberi and Barshim agreed to share the gold medal in a rare instance where the athletes of different nations had agreed to share the same medal in the history of Olympics. Barshim in particular was heard to ask a competition official "Can we have two golds?" in response to being offered a 'jump off'. Maksim Nedasekau of Belarus took bronze. The medals were the first ever in the men's high jump for Italy and Belarus, the first gold in the men's high jump for Italy and Qatar, and the third consecutive medal in the men's high jump for Qatar (all by Barshim). Barshim became only the second man to earn three medals in high jump, joining Patrik Sjöberg of Sweden (1984 to 1992).

Summary

Thirteen jumpers qualified for the final by jumping over 2.28 metres, Tom Gale was the last and only qualifier requiring three attempts at the height. In the final, ten jumpers cleared 2.30 metres, eight over 2.33 metres, and four cleared 2.35 metres on their first attempt, including Woo Sang-hyeok jumping 4 centimetres above his personal best. All the while, returning silver medalist Mutaz Essa Barshim and former world indoor champion Gianmarco Tamberi maintained a clean sheet to be tied for first place. Jumping in the first position, Barshim's perfection put pressure on the rest of the field to maintain at each new height, which only Tamberi could match. At 2.37 metres, Barshim cleared again. After missing once at 2.35 metres, Maksim Nedasekau strategically passed to 2.37 metres and made it on his first attempt. After Tamberi also cleared 2.37 metres, the three other athletes still in contention passed to 2.39 metres, with Nedasekau holding the bronze medal position pending the results at 2.39. Nobody was able to clear 2.39 metres, confirming Nedasekau with the bronze and leaving Barshim and Tamberi tied in the lead position.

Under international rules, a tie for first place must be settled with a jump off. When the official explained the next step, however, Barshim asked if they could both get gold medals. Technically, the officials agreed this was possible as they cannot force them to jump again. Close friends who had both battled back from serious injury, Tamberi and Barshim looked at each other grinning, wordlessly agreeing to share the top step; they clasped hands, embraced and each then celebrated the shared gold medal. 

The moment between the athletes, televised live and globally, was quickly praised as an iconic moment, a supreme act of friendship and sportsmanship, and one of the highlights of the Games.

Background
This was the 29th appearance of the event – one of 12 athletics events to have been held at every Summer Olympics.

No nations made their men's high jump debut, though Russian athletes competed as "ROC" for the first time. The United States made its 28th appearance, most of any nation, having missed only the boycotted 1980 Games.

Qualification

A National Olympic Committee (NOC) could enter up to 3 qualified athletes in the men's high jump event if all athletes meet the entry standard or qualify by ranking during the qualifying period. (The limit of 3 has been in place since the 1930 Olympic Congress.) The qualifying standard is 2.33 metres. This standard was "set for the sole purpose of qualifying athletes with exceptional performances unable to qualify through the IAAF World Rankings pathway." The world rankings, based on the average of the best five results for the athlete over the qualifying period and weighted by the importance of the meet, will then be used to qualify athletes until the cap of 32 is reached.

The qualifying period was originally from 1 May 2019 to 29 June 2020. Due to the COVID-19 pandemic, the period was suspended from 6 April 2020 to 30 November 2020, with the end date extended to 29 June 2021. The world rankings period start date was also changed from 1 May 2019 to 30 June 2020; athletes who had met the qualifying standard during that time were still qualified, but those using world rankings would not be able to count performances during that time. The qualifying  standards could be obtained in various meetings during the given period that have the approval of the IAAF. Both outdoor and indoor meets are eligible. The most recent Area Championships may be counted in the ranking, even if not during the qualifying period.

NOCs can also use their universality place—each NOC can enter one male athlete regardless of mark if they had no male athletes meeting the entry standard for an athletics event—in the high jump, but no such place was awarded in this event.

On 29 June 2021, 16 high jumpers qualified with entry standard and 16 by ranking position.

Entry number: 32. Entry standard – 2.33 m:

Entry number (target): 32. One athlete from Belarus was lately added, post qualification period.

This qualification list does not include Danil Lysenko of Russia (formerly competed as ANA), 2.40 m in 2018, but since under a 6-year ban by Court of Arbitration for Sport for doping. However, the list includes all the 7 jumpers with more than the 2.33 m Entry Standard since 2019:

This list includes also all the main last major championships winners since 2018: Barshim (WCh Doha 2019), Przybylko (ECh Berlin 2018), Ferreira (SACh Guayaquil 2021), Ghazal (AsCh Doha 2019), Sawe (AfCh Asaba 2018), Kerr (OCh Townsville 2019), Starc (Commonwealth Games 2018), Zayas (Pan American Games 2019) and Harrison and Lovett, the US and Canadian Olympic Trials' winners.

The main non-qualifiers are all with marks below the entry standard of 2.33 m, but:
Trey Culver (USA), qualified by Entry Standard, 2.33 m at Ocean Breeze Athl. Complex, New York (USA) – on 13 February 2021 but not in the first 3 at the US Olympic Trials.
There are 6 jumpers with more than 2.30 m in 2021, not qualified by ranking:
Andrei Churyla (BLR) 2.31
Erik Kynard and Jeron Robinson (USA) 2.30 
Ushan Thiwanka (SRI) 2.30
Wang Zhen (CHN) 2.30
 (SWE) 2.30.

The Belgian Thomas Carmoy is the first non-qualifier as the next best by World Rankings	(31st – 1214p).

From the 45 qualified jumpers of the last 2016 Summer Olympics, only 13 will also compete in Tokyo, 5 years later.

Competition format
The 2020 competition continued to use the two-round format introduced in 1912. There were two distinct rounds of jumping with results cleared between rounds. Jumpers were eliminated if they had three consecutive failures, whether at a single height or between multiple heights if they attempted to advance before clearing a height.

The qualifying round had the bar set at various heights up to a qualifying standard of 2.30 metres. All jumpers clearing that standard advanced to the final. A minimum of 12 jumpers advanced; if fewer than 12 achieved the qualifying standard, the top 12 (including ties after use of the countback rules) would advance. It has been common in recent Games for few enough jumpers to achieve the last height below the qualifying standard that none even attempt the qualifying standard.

The final had jumps starting just below the qualifying standard and increasing gradually. The final continued until all jumpers were eliminated.

Records
Prior to this competition, the world, Olympic, and area records were as follows.

The following national records were established during the competition:

Schedule
All times are Japan Standard Time (UTC+9)

The men's high jump took place over two separate days.

Results

Qualifying round
Qualification rule: Qualifying performance 2.30 (Q) or at least 12 best performers (q) advance to the final.

Final 

o Valid trial | x Failed trial | - Passed trial | NR National Record | SB Season Best | =NR Equal National Record | =SB Equal Season Best

References

Men's high jump
2020
Men's events at the 2020 Summer Olympics